Where Have All the Leaders Gone? is a book by Lee Iacocca, the former CEO of Chrysler, published in 2007.

Iacocca discusses  the characteristics of a good leader, citing these Cs: Curiosity, Creative, Communicate, Character, Courage, Conviction, Charisma, Competent, Common Sense and the one he regards as most important, Crisis. He expands on these ideas on website LeeIacocca.net.

External links
 LeeIaccoca.net

Business books
Books by Lee Iacocca
2007 non-fiction books